La Réforme was a French political newspaper of the mid-19th century. Founded in Paris on 29 July 1843 by Alexandre Ledru-Rollin, the newspaper had a left-wing radical liberal republican editorial line, and published some early socialist works. Its regular contributors included the radicals Étienne Arago, Godefroy Cavaignac, and Victor Schœlcher and the early socialists Louis Blanc, Pierre Leroux, and Félix Pyat. The socialist figures Pierre-Joseph Proudhon, Karl Marx, and Mikhail Bakunin also published articles. The editor was Ferdinand Flocon.

Members of the newspaper were part of the provisional government of 1848, who led the Second Republic in the spring of 1848.

In February 1848, Charles Ribeyrolles became the editor to replace Ferdinand Flocon. However, after the demonstration at the Arts-et-Métier on 13 June 1849, Ribeyrolles was tried in absentia by the High Court of Justice of Versailles. On the run, he escaped police and gave Senator Pierre Joigneaux instructions for the management of the newspaper during his absence, which he hoped would be short.

It ceased publication in January 1850.

Circulation figures: 1698 copies in 1845, 1860 copies in 1846.

References

Defunct newspapers published in France
Newspapers published in Paris
Daily newspapers published in France
Publications established in 1843
Publications disestablished in 1850